Langsner is a surname. Notable people with the surname include:

 Jacobo Langsner (1927–2020), Uruguayan playwright and writer
 Jules Langsner (1911–1967), American art critic and psychiatrist

See also
 Langner